The 1996 FIFA Futsal World Championship qualification is the qualification process organized by the Asian Football Confederation (AFC) to determine the participating teams for the 1996 FIFA Futsal World Championship, the 3rd edition of the international men's futsal championship of FIFA. A total of 3 teams qualify to play in the World Championship. The qualification process will be divided to three zones.

Draw 

Notes
Teams in bold qualified for the FIFA World Championship.

East Zone

West Zone

ASEAN Zone

Qualified teams
The following 3 teams qualified for the 1996 FIFA Futsal World Championship

1 Bold indicates champions for that year. Italic indicates hosts for that year.

See also 
 1996 FIFA Futsal World Championship

References

External links 
 RSSSF – Asian Futsal World Cup Qualifiers 1996

Qual
1996
1996
1996
1995–96 in Hong Kong football
1995–96 in Iranian football
1996 in Japanese football
1996 in Chinese football
1996 in Asian football